Somkid Chuenta (Thai สมคิด ชื่นตา), born 1978 in Surin, Thailand) is a former Thai futsal Goalkeeper, and  a member of  Thailand national futsal team. He is a particularly eccentric player, known for his constant play outside the penalty area as well as his acrobatic style in goal.

See also
Thailand Beach Soccer Team
Thailand Squad On Fifa.com

Thailand national beach soccer team

Somkid Chuenta
1978 births
Living people
Futsal goalkeepers
Somkid Chuenta
Association football goalkeepers